Gabriele Meinel is a German cross country skier. She started for the SG Dynamo Klingenthal / Sportvereinigung (SV) Dynamo. She won the gold medal at the world championships for Dynamo.

References 

German female cross-country skiers
Living people
Year of birth missing (living people)
20th-century German women